Latin in a Satin Mood is an LP album by Julie London, released by Liberty Records under catalog number LRP-3278 as a monophonic recording and catalog number LST-7278 in stereo in 1963.

Track listing

References

Liberty Records albums
1963 albums
Julie London albums
Albums produced by Snuff Garrett
Spanish-language albums